NGC 5752 is a spiral galaxy in the constellation Boötes. It is a member of the Arp 297 interacting galaxies group which comprises four galaxies: NGC 5752, NGC 5753, NGC 5754, NGC 5755.

References

External links
 
 Distance 
 Image NGC 5752
 
 SIMBAD data

Boötes
5752
52685
Interacting galaxies
+07-30-060
Spiral galaxies